LaNi5 is a hexagonal intermetallic compound composed of rare earth element lanthanum and transition metal nickel. It presents a calcium pentacopper (CaCu5) crystal structure. It is a melting compound with the same composition and has hydrogen storage capacity.

Structure 

LaNi5 has a calcium pentacopper (CaCu5) type crystal structure, with a hexagonal lattice, space group is P6/mmm (No. 191), with lanthanum atom is located at coordinate origin 1a (0,0,0), two nickel atoms are located at 2c (1/ 3,2/3,0) and (2/3,1/3,0), the other three at 3g (1/2,0,1/2), (0,1/2,1/2), (1/2,1/2,1/2), with a=511pm, c=397pm. The unit cell contains 1 LaNi5 atom, the volume is 90×10-24 cm3, the LaNi5 unit cell contains a larger The six deformed tetrahedral voids can be used to fill in hydrogen atoms.

Chemical reactions 

As a hydrogen storage alloy, LaNi5 can absorb hydrogen to form the hydride LaNi5Hx (x≈6) when the pressure is slightly high and the temperature is low, or when the pressure decreases or the temperature increases, hydrogen can be released to form repeated absorption and release of hydrogen. But for the dehydrogenation process, because it is an endothermic reaction, in order to enable the reaction to proceed, the necessary energy must be added, otherwise the reaction will stop due to the decrease in temperature.

Characteristics and applications 

The hydrogen storage density per unit volume (crystal) of LaNi5H6.5 at 2 bar is equal to the density of gaseous molecular hydrogen at 1800 bar, and all hydrogen can be desorbed at 2 bar. Although the hydrogen storage density in practical applications is reduced due to the aggregation of some LaNi5 powders, it is still higher than the density of liquid hydrogen. This allows safe operation of hydrogen fuel. In order to improve its hydrogen storage performance, metals such as lead or manganese are often used to partially replace nickel. Currently, LaNi5 is commonly used in storage and transportation of hydrogen, hydrogen vehicle power, fuel cells, separation and purification of hydrogen, propylene hydrogenation catalysts, etc.

References 

Lanthanum compounds
Nickel compounds
Nickel alloys
Intermetallics